The Grand Large is an artificial lake in Wallonia, not far from the city of Mons in the province of Hainaut, Belgium. The lake is situated along the highway E19 between Paris and Brussels. Its marina can host 157 boats. The lake is linked to two canals: to the east, the Nimy-Blaton-Péronnes Canal, to the west the Canal du Centre.

References
 The City of Mons

Artificial lakes
Lakes of Hainaut (province)